Jana Dörries (born 24 September 1975 in Potsdam) is a German former swimmer who competed in the 1992 Summer Olympics.

References

1975 births
Living people
German female swimmers
German female breaststroke swimmers
Olympic swimmers of Germany
Swimmers at the 1992 Summer Olympics
Olympic silver medalists for Germany
Sportspeople from Potsdam
World Aquatics Championships medalists in swimming
European Aquatics Championships medalists in swimming
Medalists at the 1992 Summer Olympics
Olympic silver medalists in swimming